The Miniman (Swedish military designation Pansarskott m/68, abbreviated Pskott m/68) is a disposable single-shot 74-mm unguided anti-tank smooth bore recoilless weapon, designed in Sweden by Försvarets Fabriksverk (FFV) and became operational in 1968.

Description
The Miniman is delivered with the HEAT projectile pre-loaded launch tube. In appearance, the Miniman is similar to a single section tube  US M72 LAW and French Sarpac of the same era. In 1986 the Swedish Army adopted the FFV AT4, designated the Pansarskott m/86, to replace the Miniman. FFV engineers adopted the rugged but simple firing and safety mechanism of the Miniman for the AT4. The Miniman uses a unique version of the high-low chamber launch system that results in no recoil.

The Miniman's HEAT projectile has a copper liner and can penetrate  of rolled homogeneous armour.

Users

Former users
 - known as PAR 70 (Panzerabwehrrohr 70).
 - known as 74 KES 68 Miniman (74 millimetrin kertasinko malli 1968 Miniman, '74 millimetre disposable recoilless rifle model 1968 Miniman').
 - known as Pskott m/68 (Pansarskott modell 1968), replaced by the m/86.

Reference and notes

 (JIW) Ian Hogg, Jane's Infantry Weapons 1984-85, London: Jane's Publishing Company Ltd., 1984.

External links
 ordata information on HEAT projectile

Firearms of Sweden